Baymunduz (before 2004: Интернационал Internatsional) is a village in Jalal-Abad Region, Kyrgyzstan. It is part of the Bazar-Korgon District. Its population was 3,921 in 2021.

References
 

Populated places in Jalal-Abad Region